The 1910 British Isles tour to South Africa was the eighth tour by a British Isles rugby union team and the fourth to South Africa. It is retrospectively classed as one of the British Lions tours, as the Lions naming convention was not adopted until 1950. As well as South Africa, the tour included a game in Bulawayo in Rhodesia, now Zimbabwe.

Led by Ireland's Tommy Smyth and managed by Walter E. Rees and W Cail the tour took in 24 matches. Of the 24 games, 21 were against club or invitational teams and three were test matches against the South African national team. The British Isles team lost two and won one test match against the Springboks.

Seven players from Newport RFC were selected for the tour which was for a time the record for players selected from one club for a British Lions Tour.

The Lions jerseys switched from red to blue, with white shorts and red socks. This combination would remain until 1950.

Touring party

Managers: Walter E. Rees and William Cail

Notes

Results
Complete list of matches played by the British Isles in South Africa:

 Test matches

References

British Lions tour
British & Irish Lions tours of South Africa
British Lions Tour To South Africa, 1910
Rugby union tours of Zimbabwe
1909–10 in British rugby union
1910 in Irish sport